Rais Mustafayevich Galimov (born 5 October 1946, in Kazan) is a sailor from the Soviet Union. Galimov represented his country at the 1972 Summer Olympics in Kiel. Galimov took 7th place in the Soling with Timir Pinegin as helmsman and Valentin Zamotaykin as fellow crew member.

References

Living people
1946 births
Sportspeople from Kazan
Soviet male sailors (sport)
Sailors at the 1972 Summer Olympics – Soling
Olympic sailors of the Soviet Union